Allyson Brooke Hernandez (born July 7, 1993) is an American singer. She is a former member of the girl group Fifth Harmony. In 2017, Brooke was featured alongside rapper ASAP Ferg on the single "Look at Us Now" by Lost Kings. Afterwards, she released "Perfect" with DJ Topic. Following Fifth Harmony's indefinite hiatus, Brooke signed a record deal with Atlantic, and collaborated on the single "Vámonos", with Kris Kross Amsterdam and Messiah.

Her major label debut single "Low Key" featuring Tyga, was released in 2019. Brooke competed in season 28 of Dancing with the Stars, placing third alongside her partner Sasha Farber. Her book Finding Your Harmony was released in 2020.

Life and Career

1993-2011: Early life and career beginnings 
Allyson Brooke Hernandez was born on July 7, 1993, in San Antonio, Texas, where she was raised by parents Jerry Hernandez and Patricia Castillo. She has an older brother, Brandon. Brooke was a 6-week-premature baby, weighing in at one pound and fourteen ounces when she was born. She is of Mexican descent but did not grow up speaking Spanish, as her parents decided to prevent her from being discriminated against in school. Brooke attended Cornerstone Christian Elementary School in San Antonio, and completed her high school education through home-schooling.

2012-2018: The X Factor and Fifth Harmony 

Brooke auditioned for The X Factor in Austin, Texas, not far from her hometown in San Antonio, singing "On My Knees" from contemporary Christian and Latin pop singer Jaci Velasquez. For her bootcamp round she sang against Julia Bullock singing "Knockin' on Heaven's Door". She was eliminated during the bootcamp round of competition, but was brought back along with Dinah Jane, Normani, Lauren Jauregui, and Camila Cabello to form the group now known as Fifth Harmony. The group advanced to the live shows and managed to finish in third place. Her grandfather died during the week 4 performance of "Stronger (What Doesn't Kill You)" by Kelly Clarkson.

After the finale of The X Factor, Fifth Harmony was signed to Syco Music and Epic Records. The group released their first Extended Play (EP), Better Together in 2013, along with the albums Reflection in 2015 and 7/27 in 2016. They released their self-titled third studio album Fifth Harmony on August 25, 2017. On March 19, 2018, the group announced an indefinite hiatus to focus on their solo projects.

2017–2020: Solo projects and Finding Your Harmony memoir 

Brooke's first solo project was a feat on American DJ-duo Lost Kings song "Look at Us Now" along with American rapper ASAP Ferg. The song was released on June 9, 2017. In July 2017, she was set to perform a solo show in São Paulo, but the show was cancelled. Brooke joined Plácido Domingo to sing two songs on January 24, 2018, at the Convention Center's Lila Cockrell Theatre in San Antonio, Texas. Brooke collaborated with German DJ Topic for the song "Perfect", released on January 26, 2018, along with its music video. She performed the song during an episode of Wild 'n Out in March 2018.

In early 2018, Brooke joined the other members of Fifth Harmony in an episode of Lip Sync Battle, performing a medley of songs by Selena and Jennifer Lopez. In March 2018, she sang a medley of songs from Oscar-winning films such as "Beauty and the Beast" and "My Heart Will Go On" during the E! News broadcast of the red carpet pre-show of the 90th Academy Awards. On March 12, 2018, Brooke signed with Maverick Entertainment as a solo artist. She appeared in an episode of season 2 of Famous in Love as herself.

In April 2018, Brooke confirmed she is working on her debut solo studio album, with producers 1500 or Nothin'. In August 2018, it was announced that Brooke signed a record deal with Latium Entertainment and Atlantic Records. The company also announced that Brooke would release her debut solo single later in the fall. She debuted a new, Spanish-language song called "Vámonos" at the Fusion Festival in Liverpool, England on September 2, 2018. The song was released on November 23, 2018, as a collaboration with Kris Kross Amsterdam and Messiah; she also performed the song prior to its official release at the 2018 ALMA Awards. Brooke released a cover of "Last Christmas" by Wham! on November 16, 2018, and performed it at the Macy's Thanksgiving Day Parade. She then announced her memoir, Finding Your Harmony, which was set to hit bookshelves in April 2019. On December 21, 2018, Brooke released a song called "The Truth Is In There", written by Diane Warren, as part of Weight Watchers International's Wellness That Works campaign.

"Low Key", Brooke's official debut solo single, was released on January 31, 2019. In July 2019, Brooke said the goal was to release her debut album in spring of 2020. In May 2019, Brooke released the single "Lips Don't Lie" featuring rapper A Boogie wit da Hoodie.

In September 2019, Brooke performed the opening theme song to Nickelodeon's The Casagrandes, a spin-off of The Loud House  in which she also plays the fictional popstar Alisa Barela. She released the song and music video for the single "Higher" with Matoma in September 2019. From September to November 2019, Brooke competed on the 28th season of Dancing with the Stars, finishing in third place. Brooke danced to her own song "Higher" while on Dancing with the Stars, where she received her first perfect score from the judges. In November, Brooke released the single "No Good". On December 8, 2019, she opened the Miss Universe beauty pageant, performing a medley of her singles and a Selena tribute with "I Could Fall in Love" and "Dreaming of You".

In January 2020, she announced her Time To Shine Tour on social media with shows in North America, which kicked off on March 6, 2020, in Chicago, IL at the House of Blues. However, due to the COVID-19 pandemic, the tour was cancelled until further notice.

In May 2020, Brooke revealed the cover of her upcoming memoir, Finding Your Harmony. The book was released on October 13, 2020. The memoir covers aspects of her life, including her childhood and her rise as a solo artist. In August 2020, Brooke stated she wants to release an album in the future but is taking her time, and that it could be released in 2021. Brooke was cast in the upcoming film High Expectations, playing the role of "Sofia".

2021–present: Mi Música 
In August 2021, Brooke signed a joint record deal with indie labels Duars Entertainment and AMSI, becoming the first female artist signed to either company.

In October 2021, Brooke spoke to magazine ¡Hola! about her debut album, revealing that it would be an entirely Spanish-language album. Brooke then teased the single "Mi Música" on Twitter to be released on October 22, 2021, with the teaser "Out of the darkness and into the light".

Personal life 
Brooke is a Christian and has claimed that she will remain a virgin until marriage. Brooke said she currently has a Spanish tutor.

She has cited Selena, Carrie Underwood, Justin Timberlake and Bruno Mars as her influences.

Philanthropy 

With Fifth Harmony, Brooke was involved with charities DoSomething.org and the Ryan Seacrest Foundation. She has also participated in activities by the ASPCA. Brooke is the Celebrity Ambassador for March of Dimes, a nonprofit organization working to prevent premature birth, birth defects and infant mortality. In December 2016, she took part in a toy drive in her hometown, San Antonio, benefiting children at local hospitals.

Discography

Studio albums
 Mi Música (TBA)

Filmography

Awards and nominations

Tours 

Headlining
 Time to Shine Tour (2020; cancelled)

Notes

References

External links 

1993 births
Living people
21st-century Christians
21st-century American women singers
21st-century American singers
American Christians
American musicians of Mexican descent
Christians from Texas
Fifth Harmony members
Hispanic and Latino American women singers
Hispanic and Latino American people
Atlantic Records artists
Musicians from San Antonio
Singers from Texas
The X Factor (American TV series) contestants